Corrado Merli (born 17 October 1959) is an Italian former footballer.

Club career

After his 1977 debut with Mantova, in the autumn of 1978 he joined Rimini. The team was relegated to Serie C in the 1978–1979 season, but Merli secured a spot amongst the reserves until Rimini was promoted again to Serie B in 1979–1980. He then joined the first team for the next two Serie B seasons, until he transferred to Brescia to play two more seasons of Serie C1.

His careers continued in Serie C1, playing three years with Carrarese and then with Fidelis Andria, winning the Serie C2 Championship in 1988–1989. He then played another year in Serie C2 with Giulianova until finishing his career in Serie D with Santegidiese in 1993.

During his Serie B career with Rimini, he achieved a total of 65 appearances and 2 goals, with a grand total of 364 appearances and 8 goals throughout his professional football career.

After Retirement 

Despite retiring from professional football, Merli has taken part in multiple iterations of "Emanuele una partita per la vita", annual charity football event in favour of the Associazione Romagnola Cystic fibrosis, in which various showbiz personalities play a friendly match against former/current athletes from several different sports. The charity match takes place every year at the Stadio Romeo Neri in Rimini, Italy.

References

External links
 Corrado Merli on CorriereCalciatori.it 
 Corrado Merli on LegaB.it 

1959 births
Italian footballers
Association football defenders
Sportspeople from the Province of Mantua
Rimini F.C. 1912 players
Mantova 1911 players
Brescia Calcio players
Carrarese Calcio players
S.S. Fidelis Andria 1928 players
Giulianova Calcio players
Serie B players
Serie C players
Serie D players
Living people
Footballers from Lombardy